Leuzinger High School is a public high school (9th through 12th grades) in Lawndale, California, United States. It opened on January 27, 1931, with an enrollment of 268. It was named after Adolph Leuzinger in recognition of his 25 years of service on the board of trustees of the Inglewood Union High School District. The school is in the Centinela Valley Union High School District.

Leuzinger High had an enrollment of 1,726 as of the 2013–14 school year.

Faculty and administration
For many years, Leuzinger High School was considered to be a typical inner-city school, mostly known for producing athletes such as Kei Kamara, Marvcus Patton and Russell Westbrook. However, over the past few years, it has consistently shown academic growth spurts, largely due to its faculty and administration. As of 2021, the administration is headed by principal Dr. Howard Ho, and associate principals Rosalyn Varee, Jose Varela, and Dr. Karma Nicolis.

Olympic mascot
As Leuzinger's first senior class graduated while the 1932 Summer Olympics were hosted in and around nearby Los Angeles, the school's nickname became the "Olympians". Leuzinger was granted authorization for the school to use the Olympic name and Olympic rings trademark. In turn, the campus of the "Olympians" also provided staging for aspects of the 1932 Olympics; facilities for the use of competitors, including a shooting range, and a bowling alley, were constructed under the main building. On September 8, 1936, construction on a women's gym with an Olympic-size swimming pool was begun. However eventual earthquake damage, combined with tougher safety codes and remodeling opportunities, required the pool's removal.

Notable alumni 

Tiran Porter, class of 1966, The Doobie Brothers bass guitarist
George Foster, class of 1967, Cincinnati Reds outfielder, two-time World Series champion and 1977 National League Most Valuable Player
Mike Gin, mayor of Redondo Beach, California
Ross Jeffries, author, "speed seduction" guru
Kei Kamara, New England Revolution striker
Kurupt attended Leuzinger in the late 1980s before dropping out.
Marvcus Patton, linebacker for UCLA and Buffalo Bills; played in four Super Bowls
Russell Westbrook, Los Angeles Clippers guard, two-time league scoring champion and 2017 NBA Most Valuable Player
Delon Wright, Atlanta Hawks guard, first-round selection of 2015 NBA Draft
Dorell Wright, Lokomotiv Kuban guard-forward
Gyasi Zardes, forward for Columbus Crew

References

External links 
 Leuzinger High School

High schools in Los Angeles County, California
Lawndale, California
Public high schools in California
1931 establishments in California
Educational institutions established in 1931